Journal of Radiological Protection is a quarterly peer-reviewed scientific journal covering radiobiological research on all aspects of radiological protection, including non-ionizing as well as ionizing radiations. It is the official journal of the Society for Radiological Protection and published on their behalf by IOP Publishing. It was established in 1981 as the Journal of the Society for Radiological Protection, before obtaining its current name in 1988. The editor-in-chief is Richard Wakeford (University of Manchester).

Abstracting and indexing 
The journal is abstracted and indexed in:

According to the Journal Citation Reports, the journal had a 2020 impact factor of 1.394.

See also
 Centre for Radiation, Chemical and Environmental Hazards (CRCE) in Oxfordshire

References

External links 
 

Physics journals
IOP Publishing academic journals
English-language journals
Quarterly journals
Publications established in 1988
Radiation protection